Kyiv-Pasazhyrskyi (Kyiv-Passenger) is a railway station in the capital of Ukraine, Kyiv. The station is a railway hub consisting of several railroad station buildings, along with its own repair facilities the Kyiv Electric Railcar Repair Shop, a railway depot with railyard, and the railway sports complex, which is integrated into the cityscape. The station is part of the so-called Kyiv Southern Railway loop.

Serving more than 170,000 passengers per day (as of 2005), the complex contains several buildings. The Central and Southern (Pivdennyi) Station buildings are located on both sides of the tracks used by long-distance trains, connected with an overpass leading the station platform. They serve international trains, most Ukrzaliznytsia passenger trains, some suburban trains, and the Kyiv Boryspil Express to the Boryspil International Airport. Adjacent to the Central building is the Suburban (Prymiskyi) station building which serves short-distance service (elektrichka) for suburbs (including dacha areas), minor city stations, and nearby regions as well as the Kyivpastrans' urban rail passing through the Northern (Pivnichna) railway stop.

The Kyiv Metro station Vokzalna of the Sviatoshynsko-Brovarska Line adjoins the complex, constituting the station's main intersection with city transport. The Kyiv tram station Starovokzalna (the terminal of Kyiv's Right-Bank high-speed tram line) is also adjacent via a passageway.

History and architecture
The old Kyiv railroad station was constructed from 1868 to 1870, as a part of Kyiv-Balta and Kyiv-Kursk railroad constructions, which were also completed in 1870. The station was located in a valley of Lybid’ river, replacing soldiers' and gendarmes' settlements. The two-floor brick station building of Old English Gothic style was by the architect М. V. Vyshnevetskyi.

The current Central Station building was constructed in 1927-1932 and designed by O. Verbytskyi. It was built in the style of Ukrainian Baroque with some elements of Constructivism. The Central Station building is designated as the Landmark of Architecture, numbered 193. The equipment and interior of the hall of deputies of the Supreme Council at the station was made by the architect Irma Karakis.

In 2001, the building was restored to roughly its original state. In the same year, the new modern "Southern Station" building was erected at the opposite side of Central Station's sixteen tracks, being in reality not a separate station but merely another large entrance way to the Central Station, with new ticket windows and linked by a hallway above the track accesses. Both buildings are connected with an overpass for passengers. The renovation project also included two large underground parking structures, one of which remains uncompleted to date. The construction of the southern station building was done on the efforts of Heorhiy Kirpa.

Name disambiguation
Officially, Kyiv-Pasazhyrskyi railway station is regarded as the whole huge complex of passenger terminals, railways, depots etc. with respective personnel. Practically, such installations in post-Soviet countries are widely known as railroad vokzals, which means the building(s) and services immediately serving passengers for various types of transport. The official name Kyiv-Pasazhyrskyi is not used colloquially, appearing only in tickets, schedules etc. By the same token, the locally popular terms "Central Station" and "Southern Station" do not appear in such technical literature, as for internal purposes they are treated as the same location.

The name Kyiv-Pasazhyrskyi (literally Kyiv Passenger) is also used to differentiate it from other railway stations across the city such as Kyiv-Volynsky, Kyiv-Demiivskii, Kyiv-Tovarny, others.

Development plans
Currently, the station is severely overloaded with suburban traffic, intercity traffic (especially during the height of winter and summer holidays), and also subway traffic (in daily rush hours). Relief plans include:
Upgrading Darnytsia station to make it a second long-distance passenger station, serving the Left-Bank of the city (including new sleeping car maintenance facility.)
Construction of a second surface entrance for the Vokzalna metro station, which is currently the most overloaded station of the metro system .
Extension of the Podilsko-Vyhurivska Metro Line, which is now under construction on the banks of Dnipro river, to the Vokzalna metro station.
Moving the Starovokzalna tram station closer in order to make it more accessible and extending the tram line which now serves only the northwestern districts into the city center

Trains and destinations

International Routes

Photos

See also
Ukrzaliznytsia - the national railway company of Ukraine

References

Citations

Bibliography

External links
South-Western railway of Ukraine - Official website 
  Ukraine Train Tickets - Online Sales

Railway stations in Kyiv
Southwestern Railways stations